Poseidon and the Bitter Bug is the 11th studio album by Indigo Girls, released on March 24, 2009 by Vanguard Records. The title is drawn from lines in tracks "Fleet of Hope" and "Second Time Around" – "You're all washed up when Poseidon has his day" and "I've been bitten by the bitter bug."

As of 2010 album has sold 70,000 copies in US.

Track listing
"Digging for Your Dream" (Emily Saliers) – 3:57
"Sugar Tongue" (Amy Ray) – 3:37
"Love of Our Lives" (Saliers) – 3:51
"Driver Education" (Ray) – 2:18
"I'll Change" (Saliers) – 3:23
"Second Time Around" (Ray) – 4:12
"What Are You Like?" (Saliers) – 2:51
"Ghost of the Gang" (Ray) – 3:17
"Fleet of Hope" (Saliers) – 4:27
"True Romantic" (Ray) – 4:11

Deluxe Version bonus tracks
"Ghost of the Gang" (Acoustic Version) – 3:10
"I'll Change" (Acoustic Version) – 3:58
"Sugar Tongue" (Acoustic Version) – 3:47
"Love of Our Lives" (Acoustic Version) – 3:46
"Salty South" (Ray) – 4:17
"Digging for Your Dream" (Acoustic Version) – 3:22
"Second Time Around" (Acoustic Version) – 4:43
"What Are You Like?" (Acoustic Version) – 2:50
"Driver Education" (Acoustic Version) – 2:21
"Fleet of Hope" (Acoustic Version) – 4:31
"True Romantic" (Acoustic Version) – 3:56

Personnel
Indigo Girls
Amy Ray – Vocals, acoustic guitar, electric guitar, mandolin, harmonica
Emily Saliers – Vocals, acoustic guitar, electric guitar

Additional musicians
Mitchell Froom – Keyboards
Clare Kenny – Bass guitar
Matt Chamberlain – Drums, percussion, programming
Alison Brown - Banjo
Missy Higgins - Background vocals on "Digging For Your Dream" & "True Romantic"

Production
David Boucher – Engineer
Mitchell Froom – Producer

References

External links

Blog posting by Emily on the making of the album
Blog posting by Amy with video clip of Love of Our Lives rehearsal

2009 albums
Albums produced by Mitchell Froom
Indigo Girls albums
Vanguard Records albums